Susan Floyd (born May 13, 1968) is an American actress who has appeared in many episodes of Law & Order, as well as numerous other television series. She has also had featured roles in several motion pictures, including Domestic Disturbance and Forgiven, and starred opposite Al Pacino and Jerry Orbach in Chinese Coffee. Along with mainstream films, she has also appeared in a 2003 indie film Particles of Truth.

Personal life
Floyd has been married to Brian Edward Doolittle since 2010, and has 2 children with him.

Filmography

References

External links
 

1968 births
Actresses from Cincinnati
American film actresses
American television actresses
Living people
21st-century American women